DMN or dmn may refer to:

Science 
Default mode network, a network of brain regions
Dorsal motor nucleus,  a nerve nucleus for the vagus nerve
Dorsomedial nucleus, a nerve nucleus for the hypothalamus in the brain 
Dimethylnitrosamine, a chemical

Other uses 
DMN (group), a Brazilian rap group
The Dallas Morning News
Darjah Utama Seri Mahkota Negara (D.M.N.), Malaysian Federal Award (second order of precedence)
Decision Model and Notation, an Object Management Group standard
Dunman Secondary School, a secondary school in Tampines, Singapore
 Dynamic Manufacturing Network, a virtual alliance of enterprises who collectively constitute a dispersed manufacturing network
 D.Mn., an abbreviation used for the United States District Court for the District of Minnesota
dmn, the ISO 630 code for the Mande languages